Stigmatopora is a genus of pipefishes native to the Indian and Pacific Oceans.

Species
There are currently five recognized species in this genus:
 Stigmatopora argus (J. Richardson, 1840) (spotted pipefish)
 Stigmatopora harastii  (red wide-bodied pipefish)
 Stigmatopora macropterygia A. H. A. Duméril, 1870 (long-snouted pipefish)
 Stigmatopora narinosa Browne & K. Smith, 2007 (Southern Gulf pipefish)
 Stigmatopora nigra Kaup, 1856 (wide-bodied pipefish)

References

Syngnathidae
Marine fish genera
Taxa named by Johann Jakob Kaup